Simon Terwase Zenke (born 24 December 1988) is a Nigerian professional footballer who plays as a forward.

Career
Zenke began his career in his hometown Kaduna with Kaduna United before joining RC Strasbourg in 2008.

In November 2018, he signed a contract with Romanian first division club Dinamo București. He left the club in June 2019. At the end of January 2020, Zenke then moved to French Championnat National 2 club SC Schiltigheim.

In May 2020, Zenke confirmed on social medias, that his agent was negotiating with clubs from India. The club was reportedly Hyderabad FC. However, nothing came out of it.

Personal life
His younger brother Thomas is also a footballer.

References

1988 births
Living people
Association football forwards
Nigerian footballers
Nigerian expatriate footballers
Ligue 1 players
Ligue 2 players
Süper Lig players
TFF First League players
Liga I players
Championnat National 2 players
Kaduna United F.C. players
RC Strasbourg Alsace players
Samsunspor footballers
İstanbul Başakşehir F.K. players
Şanlıurfaspor footballers
Niger Tornadoes F.C. players
AS Nancy Lorraine players
A.F.C. Tubize players
FC Dinamo București players
SC Schiltigheim players
Nigerian expatriate sportspeople in Belgium
Expatriate footballers in Belgium
Nigerian expatriate sportspeople in France
Expatriate footballers in France
Nigerian expatriate sportspeople in Turkey
Expatriate footballers in Turkey
Nigerian expatriate sportspeople in Romania
Expatriate footballers in Romania
Nigeria youth international footballers
Sportspeople from Kaduna